Mons Meg is a medieval bombard in the collection of the Royal Armouries, on loan to Historic Scotland and located at Edinburgh Castle in Scotland. It has a barrel diameter of  making it one of the largest cannons in the world by calibre.

Mons Meg was built in 1449 on the orders of Philip the Good, Duke of Burgundy and sent by him as a gift to James II, King of Scots, in 1454. The bombard was employed in sieges until the middle of the 16th century, after which it was only fired on ceremonial occasions. In 1680 the barrel burst, rendering Mons Meg unusable. The gun remained in Edinburgh Castle until 1754 when, along with other unused weapons in Scotland, it was taken to the Tower of London. Sir Walter Scott and others campaigned for its return, which was effected in 1829. Mons Meg has since been restored and is now on display within the castle.

Construction 

The bombard was manufactured from longitudinal bars of iron, hooped with rings fused into one mass. The barrel is attached to the powder chamber by means of a groove on the powder chamber into which lugs on the end of the barrel staves fit, and then bound permanently together by the hoops. The powder chamber itself is made from small pieces of iron hammer-welded together to make a solid wrought-iron forging.

History 

Mons Meg was constructed by Jehan Cambier, artillery maker to the Duke of Burgundy and it was tested at Mons in the County of Hainault in what is now Belgium, in June 1449; the Duke did not take delivery of the Mons Meg until 1453. He gave the bombard to Scotland's King James II in 1457 as a sign of his support for the Scottish king, whose marriage he had helped negotiate. 

An alternative legend about its manufacture is that it was built by a local blacksmith for the siege of Threave Castle in the Stewartry of Kirkcudbright. According to this tale, which was lent credence by Sir Walter Scott, when King James arrived at Threave to besiege the Earl of Douglas, the Clan MacLellan presented him with this bombard. The first shot fired is said to have passed clean through the castle, severing the hand of Margaret, Countess of Douglas, on the way. The gun was subsequently named after "Mollance", the lands given to the blacksmith for his service and "Meg", the name of his wife. Later historians have not taken this legend particularly seriously, not least because of the improbability that such a weapon could be forged by a village smith as well as there being ample provenance showing its history.

In April 1497, John Mawer elder, one of the castle gunners made new wheels for Mons Meg and the bombards. The cannon was drawn down the Royal Mile to the sound of minstrels playing, placed on a new carriage or "cradle" and taken to assault Norham Castle in August 1497. In early years the gun, like the other royal cannon, was painted with red lead to keep it from rusting, which cost 30 shillings in June 1539. From the 1540s Meg was retired from service and was fired only on ceremonial occasions from Edinburgh Castle. When it was fired on 3 July 1558, soldiers were paid to find and retrieve the shot from Wardie Muir, near the Firth of Forth, a distance of two miles. The salute marked the solemnisation of the marriage of Mary, Queen of Scots, to the French Dauphin.

The gun was fired on 30 October 1680 to celebrate a visit by James, Duke of Albany and York, later King James VII but the barrel burst. An English cannoneer had loaded the charge and many Scots believed that the damage was done on purpose out of jealousy, because the English had no cannon as big as this. The incident was also seen as a bad omen for the future King.

The cannon was left outside Foog's Gate at Edinburgh Castle. It was next taken, with other disused ordnance, to the Tower of London in 1754, as a result of the disarming acts against Jacobites aimed at removing weapons or spare cannon from the reach of rebellious folk. It was returned to the Castle in 1829 by order of George IV after a series of campaigns by Sir Walter Scott and the Society of Antiquaries of Scotland. Following a restoration, it sits outside St Margaret's Chapel. During the Edinburgh's annual Hogmanay celebrations Mons Meg is fired at the start of the firework display, although the effect is largely theatrical and the gun is not discharged.

Naming

The gun is not called "Mons Meg" in any contemporary references until 1678. In 1489, she first appears in record as "Monss" and in the painter's account of 1539 she is called; "Monce in the castell", the only piece with an individual name. In 1650 she was noted as "Muckle Meg". "Meg" may either be a reference to Margaret of Denmark, Queen of James III of Scotland, or simply an alliteration, while Mons was one of the locations where the cannon was tested. McKenzie records that this class of artillery was known as a murderer and Mons Meg was certainly described as such. Mons Meg was made in the town of Mons (now the Walloon French-speaking part of Belgium) or Bergen (in Dutch as in those days it was part of Flanders). Three cannons were founded, one resides in Edinburgh, one in the Flemish town of Ghent at the Friday Market and one in France but this disappeared ages ago. The one in Ghent can be visited today, undamaged. The cannon is named "Dulle Griet" which translates into "Mad Meg".

Evolution of the carriage

For a while in its early days the Mons sat on a plain box without any wheels. Evidently, when Mons Meg was removed from Edinburgh Castle in 1754, her carriage had long since rotted away. A contemporary account describes her as lying "on the ground" near the innermost gate to the castle. Presumably the Ordnance Board fabricated a new carriage after her arrival at the Tower. In 1835, after the return of Mons Meg to Edinburgh Castle, the London-made carriage rotted away too and fabrication of a cast-iron replacement was undertaken; the new carriage weighed three and a half tons and cost £53.

See also
 List of the largest cannon by calibre

References

Sources
 Gaier, Claude (1967) The Origin of Mons Meg. Journal of the Arms and Armour Society London V(12) 425–431
 Grose, Francis (1801)  Military Antiquities respecting a History of the English Army from the Conquest to the Present Time. T. Egerton and G. Kearsley London, UK
 Hewitt, J (1853) Mons Meg the ancient bombard, preserved at Edinburgh castle. Archeological Journal  10  25–32
 Lead, Peter (1984) Mons Meg: A Royal Cannon. Mennock Publishing Cheshire, UK
 Lead, Peter (2021) Mons Meg - a symbol of Scotland. Catrine: Stenlake Publishing Ltd
 McKenzie, Agnes Mure (1948). Scottish Pageant 1513–1625. Edinburgh : Oliver & Boyd.
 Norris, John (2003) Early Gunpowder Artillery 1300–1600 Motorbooks International
 Paul, Sir James Balfour (1915–1916) Ancient Artillery.  With Some Notes on Mons Meg. Proceedings of the Society of Antiquaries of Scotland 50  191–201
 Sands, Kathleen (1999) Though one of the best-documented of medieval bombards, Mons Meg was the subject of exaggeration and legend Military History.    16(3) 22–23
 Scott, Sir Walter (1817) Waverley Novels, Rob Roy (Notes G) Edinburgh
 
 Smith, Robert D and Brown, Ruth Rhynas  Bombards- Mons Meg and her sisters Royal Armouries Monograph 1

External links

 The official Edinburgh Castle website
 Mons Meg at Edinburgh Castle
 Photo of Mons Meg from RampantScotland.com

560 mm artillery
Artillery of Belgium
Artillery of Scotland
Edinburgh Castle
History of Edinburgh
Individual cannons
Medieval artillery
Military history of Scotland
Tourist attractions in Edinburgh